La bailanta is a 1988 Argentine musical film directed and written by Luis Rodrigo.

Cast
Teresa Parodi
Antonio Tarrago Ros
Alberto Busaid
Rodolfo Machado
Leandro Regúnaga
Enrique Kossi
Mario Alarcón
Mabel Dai
Alberto Lagos
Luis Rodrigo
Alba Rossani
Willy Lemos
Blas Martínez Riera
Iván Barrios

External links

1988 films
1980s Spanish-language films
Tango films
1980s musical films
1980s Argentine films